Francisco José Garanito Sousa, known as Kiko (born 24 July 1993) is a Portuguese footballer who plays for A.D. Camacha as a defender.

Football career
On 30 November 2013, Kiko made his professional debut with Marítimo B in a 2013–14 Segunda Liga match against Sporting B.

References

External links

Stats and profile at LPFP 

Kiko Sousa at ZeroZero

1993 births
Sportspeople from Funchal
Living people
Portuguese footballers
Association football defenders
Liga Portugal 2 players
F.C. Tirsense players
Gondomar S.C. players
C.S. Marítimo players
S.C. Praiense players
U.D. Leiria players
A.D. Camacha players